The Curtiss Model K, also known as the Model 4, was an American single-engined flying boat of World War I. It was an enlarged derivative of Curtiss's Model F and about 50 were built for export to the Imperial Russian Navy.

Design and development
In 1914, the Curtiss Aeroplane Company developed its Model K, an enlarged development of its successful Model F flying boat.  It was a three-bay biplane powered by a 150 hp (112 kW) Curtiss V-X engine mounted in a pusher configuration between the wings. Unlike the Model F, its wings were staggered and slightly swept, while its ailerons were mounted on the upper wing instead of between the wings.

The first flight of the Model K was delayed by problems with its engine until January 1915, with it being claimed that the aircraft was the largest single-engined flying boat in the world at the time.

Operational history
While the Model K did not attract orders from home, attempts to export it were more successful, resulting in an order for at least 51 aircraft in both flying boat and landplane versions from the Imperial Russian Navy in 1914. The crated aircraft were shipped via Vancouver and Vladivostok, resulting in serious delays in the aircraft being reassembled, such that many of them were unseaworthy due to their hulls having cracked.

Operators

Imperial Russian Navy

Specifications

References

Notes

Citations

Bibliography

Bowers, Peter M. Curtiss Aircraft 1907–1947. London: Putnam, 1979. .
Johnson, E.R. American Flying Boats and Amphibious Aircraft: An Illustrated History. Jefferson, North Carolina, USA: McFarland & Company, 2009. .

1910s United States military utility aircraft
Flying boats
Model K
Single-engined pusher aircraft
Biplanes
Aircraft first flown in 1915